Herbert J. Bloch (November 21, 1907 – September 7, 1987), who emigrated from Europe to New York City in 1936, was a philatelist and stamp dealer who became recognized as a leading expert on authentication of rare European postage stamps.

Collecting interests
Bloch, who was also a stamp dealer, specialized in Europe and built up some valuable collections of stamps for himself and his clients.

Philatelic activity
During World War II Herbert Bloch joined the H. R. Harmer organization and was the describer at auctions of the stamps of prominent collectors, such as the collection of stamps accumulated by President Franklin D. Roosevelt during the president’s lifetime.

Bloch was a member of the Friedl Expert Committee which specialized in the expertizing of rare European stamps. He later served as chairman of the expert committee of the Philatelic Foundation. And, in 1956, he joined the Mercury Stamp Company.

Honors and awards
Because of his expertise and activity within the philatelic world, Bloch was awarded a number of honors. These included signing the Roll of Distinguished Philatelists in 1968, being awarded the Luff Award for Exceptional Contributions to Philately in 1968, receiving the “Outstanding Philatelist" award by Scott Publishing Company in 1978, being awarded the Neinken Award in 1986 and the Lindenberg Medal in 1986. In 1988 Bloch was elected to the American Philatelic Society Hall of Fame.

See also
 Philatelic literature

References
 The American Philatelic Society's Hall of Fame 1985-1989, Herbert J. Bloch

1907 births
1987 deaths
Philatelic literature
American philatelists
People from New York City
Recipients of the Lindenberg Medal
Signatories to the Roll of Distinguished Philatelists
American Philatelic Society
Immigrants to the United States